= Jeevani Mental Health Program (Kerala) =

Mental health program in Kerala, India

Jeevani Mental Health Project is an initiative by the Government of Kerala aimed at improving the mental health and well-being of college students. The project was started in 2019–20 by the Directorate of Collegiate Education, Government of Kerala in 66 colleges across the state, reaching out to approximately 60,000 college students.

== Beneficiaries ==
Jeevani services were accessed by 2,315 students between October 2019 and February 2020, with the majority of beneficiaries being females (54.1%) and over a third (38.8%) being from the lower socio-economic strata. Anxiety and depression were found to be the most common presentations among those who sought help.

== Functioning ==
The initial focus of the program was at Arts and Science colleges. The mental health counsellors manning the counselling centres are post graduates in psychology. The centres open 30 minutes before the college working hours and remain open 30 minutes after the working hours. The students requiring mental health support can reach out oneself or can be referred by friends, teachers or family.
